K.P Joseph Kalarickal is an Indian writer  of books such as Gospel of Guru Sree Narayana, Notes on the era and other poems, Hormis: legend of a great banker with passion for development: biography of K.P. Hormis, founder of Federal Bank, Bishop Jonas Thaliath of Rajkot: a biography.

He was born in the temple town of Aluva on 5 March 1930 in an orthodox Christian family and many of his books are derived from his personal experiences. An MA graduate from the University of Kerala, he has worked as a Consultant FAO of the United Nations. He also worked for Cochin Shipyard and  retired as Chief Manager Finance and Management Services.

Bibliography 

 Gospel of Guru Sree Narayana
 Hormis: legend of a great banker with passion for development : biography of K.P. Hormis, founder of Federal Bank
 Notes on the era and other poems

References

Indian male novelists
Malayalam novelists
Indian male poets
Writers from Kochi
People from Aluva
1930 births
20th-century Indian novelists
Living people
Novelists from Kerala
20th-century Indian male writers